The Cross of Honour for Military Service Abroad is a Belgian military decoration originally established for award to Belgian servicemen who served for a long period of time in the Federal Republic of Germany, Zaire (now Congo), Rwanda or Burundi. It was established on 16 June 1997 in three classes.

Classes and award prerequisites
The Cross of Honour is awarded in three classes based on the duration of service in the relevant territory.  Years of service do not have to be continuous:

 The First Class is awarded for 15 years of service
 The Second Class for 10 years of service
 The Third Class for 5 years of service

However, depending on the region where the services were performed, one year of actual service may count for more than one year for the purpose of awarding the Cross of Honour. One year of service in the Congo, Rwanda or Burundi counted as five years, one year of service at the border between the former West Germany and the former East Germany counted for three years, and one year of service performed in the central region of the former West Germany counted for two years.

Insignia
The medal is a gold star with a red pearl at each tip. The star is suspended to the ribbon by a royal crown and a ring. The obverse bears a central medallion with a golden lion on a black enamelled background surrounded by a ring of blue enamel with the motto in gold letters Pro Patria.  The reverse medallion bears a crown of laurels surrounding two crossed swords. 

The ribbon is azure blue with a purple vertical border on each side and in the centre a vertical stripe the colour of which depends on the class: gold for first class, silver for second class, and red for third class.

See also
 List of Orders, Decorations and Medals of the Kingdom of Belgium

References 
 Royal Decree of 16 June 1997 Creating a Cross of Honour for Military Services Abroad (Moniteur Belge of 18 July 1997)
 Belgian military regulation DGHR-REG-DISPSYS-001 of 20 February 2006

Other sources
 Quinot H., 1950, Recueil illustré des décorations belges et congolaises, 4e Edition. (Hasselt)
 Cornet R., 1982, Recueil des dispositions légales et réglementaires régissant les ordres nationaux belges. 2e Ed. N.pl.,  (Brussels)
 Borné A.C., 1985, Distinctions honorifiques de la Belgique, 1830-1985 (Brussels)

External links
 Cross Of Honour For Military Service Abroad

1997 establishments in Belgium
Military awards and decorations of Belgium
Military of Belgium
Awards established in 1997
Long service medals